Paul Giesler (15 June 1895 – 8 May 1945) was a German Nazi Party functionary responsible for acts of brutality which included killing opponents of the regime in southern Germany. He first joined the Nazi Party (NSDAP) in 1922; he reenrolled on 1 January 1928 with Party number 72,741. From 1941 he was Gauleiter of Westphalia-South (Westfalen-Süd) and in 1942 was appointed to the position for the Gau Munich-Upper Bavaria (Gau München-Oberbayern). From 2 November 1942 to 28 April 1945 he was also Minister-President (Ministerpräsident) of Bavaria.

Life and career
The trained architect was from 1924 a Party speaker, from 1929 a Nazi Party district leader (Ortsgruppenleiter), and from January 1931 a member of the SA. In November 1933 he was elected to the Reichstag. During these early years he served chiefly in multiple SA leadership posts, rising to the rank of SA-Brigadeführer by 20 April 1934. During the Night of the Long Knives in 1934, he only narrowly missed being arrested and murdered. Brought up on charges before the Supreme Party Court, he was acquitted in April 1935. He resumed his SA career and, when the war began, he served in the Poland and France campaigns.

Only from August 1941 did Giesler once again take up important Party functions, at Martin Bormann's instigation, first becoming Gauleiter of Gau Westphalia-South on 9 November 1941 and a member of the Prussian State Council. Then on 23 June 1942, he was made Acting Gauleiter of Munich-Upper Bavaria during Adolf Wagner's illness. Retaining his position in Westphalia-South, Giesler was in command of two Gaue until he turned over the Westphalia position to Albert Hoffmann on 26 January 1943. When Wagner died on 12 April 1944, Giesler was made permanent Gauleiter in Munich. After Ludwig Siebert's death on 1 November 1942, he was also appointed acting Ministerpräsident of Bavaria. He thus accumulated both high party and governmental offices. On 16 November 1942, he was appointed the Reich Defense Commissioner for both his Gaue. On 30 January 1943 he was promoted to SA-Obergruppenführer.

In Munich, Giesler was known for speaking out against higher education for women, provoking student walk-outs of his speeches. He was also known for the capture and defeat of the White Rose (Weiße Rose) student resistance movement. In April 1945, he was appointed Reich Defense Commissioner - South and, in addition to his own Gau, was placed in charge of Gau Swabia, Reichsgau Salzburg, Reichsgau Upper Danube and Reichsgau Tirol-Vorarlberg. With help from SS units he brutally quelled the "Freedom Action Bavaria" ("Freiheitsaktion Bayern") uprising under Captain Dr. Rupprecht Gerngroß in Munich. Reflecting Giesler's fanatically loyal Nazi outlook, he was named Reichsminister for the Interior in Adolf Hitler's will of 29 April 1945, though he never had the chance to assume this post.

As American troops approached, Giesler was reported to be planning the murder of the surviving inmates at Dachau concentration camp and several of its satellite camps in March 1945, on the authority of Ernst Kaltenbrunner, Chief of the RSHA. In a 20 November 1945 interrogation of Giesler's Gaustabsamtsleiter, Hubertus "Bertus" Gerdes by Special Agent Johannes Imhoff of the Counter Intelligence Corps (CIC), Nürnberg Sub-Regional Office, Gerdes spoke of his role in sabotaging the plans for mass murder. In August 1946, in testimony given to the International Military Tribunal by Karl von Eberstein, he claimed he was ordered to use his influence with the commandant of Dachau (SS-Obersturmbannführer Eduard Weiter) to have 25,000 prisoners shot when the U.S. approached. If this couldn't be done, then Giesler, in his capacity as a Reich Defense Commissioner, would order the Luftwaffe to bomb the camp. Eberstein refused to order the shooting of the prisoners and stated that it would be impossible to find any Luftwaffe commander to give the order to bomb. Giesler then said he would poison the prisoners; Eberstein claimed he stopped Giesler by obtaining an order from Himmler to simply surrender the camps. Giesler then fired Eberstein on 20 April, on orders of Martin Bormann, for 'defeatism'.

During the last days of Nazi Germany, Giesler was behind the worst of the violence directed against "defeatists" and those seeking to surrender their districts without pointless destruction, the Penzberger Mordnacht (Night of Penzberg Murder) being one of the best-known examples of this. When it was reported to Giesler that three people had been shot in another incident in Burghausen he retorted "What, only three?"

On 8 May 1945, the day the Nazis capitulated to the Allies, Giesler and his wife and their children committed suicide, fearing capture by American troops as they fled Berchtesgaden. A local doctor practicing in Stanggass,  Dr. Gottschalk, certified Giesler's death on 8 May 1945, and he was buried in the cemetery in Berchtesgaden on 10 May 1945. His remains were later disinterred and reburied elsewhere. Giesler, an unquestioning follower of Hitler, ruled with ruthless efficiency and almost unlimited power in the last war years in Bavaria.

Awards and decorations
1914 Iron Cross 2nd Class
1914 Iron Cross 1st Class
1918 Wound Badge
1931 Brunswick Rally Badge, c.1931
Honour Chevron for the Old Guard, February 1934
Golden Party Badge, 1934
The Honour Cross of the World War 1914/1918 with Swords, c.1934
Clasp to the Iron Cross 2nd Class, October 1939
1939 Wound Badge in Silver, 1940
War Merit Cross 2nd Class without Swords
War Merit Cross 1st Class without Swords
Nazi Party Long Service Award in Bronze
Nazi Party Long Service Award in Silver

Notes

References

External links
 Detailed biography of Paul Giesler (Historisches Centrum Hagen)
 Town of Siegen: Paul Giesler's life path
 Hitler's will from 29 April 1945 (all in German)
 Picture of Paul Giesler, undated Historisches Lexikon Bayerns

1895 births
1945 suicides
People from Siegen
People from the Province of Westphalia
German Lutherans
German National People's Party politicians
Nazi Party politicians
Stahlhelm members
Holocaust perpetrators in Germany
Young German Order members
Members of the Reichstag of Nazi Germany
Nazi Party officials
Gauleiters
Nazis who committed suicide in Germany
Joint suicides by Nazis
Prussian Army personnel
Ministers-President of Bavaria
20th-century Lutherans
1945 deaths
German Army personnel of World War I